Maghull North is a station in Maghull, Merseyside, England, on the Northern Line of Merseyrail. The station opened on 18 June 2018 to serve the north end of Maghull. The station serves as the main station for Moss Side, Ashworth Hospital and planned new housing.

History
An announcement was made in December 2010 that a planned prison and proposed new railway station had been axed by Government spending cutbacks.

However, in June 2014 it was announced that the land was to be used for housing and that the station would be built as part of the project. Further mention was made in Merseytravel's 30 Year Plan and in November 2015 proposals were opened for public comment.

In October 2016, the Liverpool City Region Combined Authority approved the business case for the station, which was expected to cost £13 million to build. The station was planned to have two  platforms, a 156-space car park, step-free access and provision for electric vehicle charging points, as well as connections to pedestrian, bus and cycle routes.

Sefton Council approved the planning permission for the station in January 2017, and work began on the station in September 2017.
On Monday 18 June 2018, the station opened to passengers, making it the first new railway station in the region in 20 years.

Services
The station is on the Ormskirk to Liverpool branch of the Northern Line. Trains run every 15 minutes during the day, Monday to Saturday. During the evening, and all day on Sundays, services run every 30 minutes.

References 

Railway stations served by Merseyrail
Railway stations in the Metropolitan Borough of Sefton
Railway stations in Great Britain opened in 2018
Railway stations opened by Network Rail
Maghull